The 117th Pennsylvania House of Representatives District is located in Lackawanna County, Luzerne County and all of Wyoming County and includes the following areas:

 Lackawanna County
 Benton Township
 Dalton
 La Plume Township
 West Abington Township
 Luzerne County
 Dallas
 Dallas Township
 Fairmount Township
 Franklin Township
 Harveys Lake
 Hunlock Township
 Lake Township
 Lehman Township
 Ross Township
 All of Wyoming County

Representatives

References

Government of Columbia County, Pennsylvania
Government of Luzerne County, Pennsylvania
Government of Wyoming County, Pennsylvania
117